The 2016 Manitoba general election was held on April 19, 2016 to elect members to the Legislative Assembly of Manitoba, Canada. The New Democratic Party of Manitoba, led by Greg Selinger, were defeated by the Progressive Conservative Party of Manitoba led by Brian Pallister, ending nearly 17 years of NDP government. The Tories won 40 seats, one of the largest majority governments in Manitoba history, the other one was in 1915 when Liberals also won 40 seats.

The election also removed one of the two New Democratic governments in the country, the other being formed by the Alberta New Democratic Party.

Date
Under the Manitoba Elections Act, the general election is to be held on the first Tuesday of October in the fourth calendar year, following the previous election. As the last election was held in 2011, that date would be October 6, 2015. However, the act also provides that if, as of January 1 of the election year, the election period would overlap with a federal election period, the provincial election is to be postponed until the third Tuesday of the following April. Under the federal fixed-term act, on January 1, 2015, the next federal election was tentatively scheduled for October 19, 2015, overlapping election periods by approximately three weeks. Thus the next Manitoba election was scheduled for April 19, 2016. The Lieutenant Governor retains the power to dissolve the Legislative Assembly early. The legislature was dissolved and writs or the election were dropped on March 16, 2016.

Campaign 
The election was relatively unique within Canadian politics, in that opinion polling indicated that most voters were basing their decision on the local candidate in their riding or the party platform, not the performance of the leader. In most Canadian elections, such as the 2016 Saskatchewan election, the behaviour of the party leader was a stronger motivator for constituents when voting; in the context of the Manitoba election, however, polling found that none of the three main party leaders was particularly well-liked or trusted by the electorate. Although Pallister fared best with 33 per cent support in public opinion polling on the question of preferred premier, even he finished only one point ahead of "none of the above" at 32 per cent.

The campaigns of all three parties were based on themes of change, with even Selinger suggesting the incumbent NDP government would be able to respond to constituent concerns and change problematic policies in the leaders' debate. Opinion polling during the campaign suggested a lack of enthusiasm for all party leaders, and a general desire for change.

Election summary
The Tories went into the election as heavy favourites, having led opinion polls for almost four years. They scored a near-sweep of rural southern and central Manitoba, and also made significant inroads in Winnipeg, taking every seat in the southern and western portions of the capital. In many cases, previously safe NDP seats either fell to the Tories or saw the NDP margins cut by more than half.

|- 
!rowspan="2" colspan="2"|Party
!rowspan="2"|Leader
!rowspan="2"|Candidates
!colspan="4"|Seats
!colspan="3"|Popular vote
|-
!2011
!Dissol.
!2016
!+/-
!Votes
!%
!% change

|align=left|Brian Pallister
|57 ||19 |||19 || 40|| +21||232,215 ||53.10 ||+9.39

|align=left|Greg Selinger
|57 ||37 ||35 || 14|| -21||112,748 ||25.78 ||−20.38

|align=left|Rana Bokhari
|51 ||1 ||1 || 3|| +2||62,973 ||14.40 ||+6.88

|align=left|James Beddome
|30 ||– ||– || –|| –||22,188 ||5.07 ||+2.55
|-

|align=left|Gary Marshall
|16 ||– ||– || –|| –||4,887 ||1.12 ||n/a
|-

|align=left|Darrell Rankin
|6 ||– ||– || –|| –||305 ||0.07 ||+0.03

| colspan="2" style="text-align:left;"|Independents
|4 ||– ||– || –|| –||2,032 ||0.46 ||+0.41

| colspan="4" style="text-align:left;"|Vacant
|2
| colspan="5" |
|-
| style="text-align:left;" colspan="3"|Total
|221 ||57 ||57 ||57 || ||437,348 || ||
|}

Summary results

Incumbents not contesting their seats

Opinion polls

Candidates by riding
 Note that names in bold type represent Cabinet members, while italics represent party leaders.

Northern Manitoba

|-
| style="background:whitesmoke;"|Flin Flon
||
|Tom Lindsey1,106
|
|Angela Enright954
|
|Leslie Beck948
|
|
|
|Clarence Pettersen (Ind.)359
||
|Clarence Pettersen
|-
| style="background:whitesmoke;"|Kewatinook
|
|Eric Robinson1,207
|
|Edna Nabess375
||
|Judy Klassen1,565
|
|
|
|
||
|Eric Robinson
|-
| style="background:whitesmoke;"|Swan River
|
|Ron Kostyshyn2,408
||
|Rick Wowchuk4,081
|
|Shayne Lynxleg483
|
|Dan Soprovich296
|
|
||
|Ron Kostyshyn
|-
| style="background:whitesmoke;"|The Pas
||
|Amanda Lathlin1,976
|
|Doug Lauvstad1,765
|
|Tyler Duncan586
|
|Patrick Wood217
|
|
||
|Amanda Lathlin
|-
| style="background:whitesmoke;"|Thompson
|
|Steve Ashton1,527
||
|Kelly Bindle1,712
|
|Inez Vystrcil-Spence638
|
|
|
|
||
|Steve Ashton
|}

Westman/Parkland

|-
| style="background:whitesmoke;"|Agassiz
|
|Courtney Lucas450
||
|Eileen Clarke5,228
|
|
|
|Robert Smith409
|
|Damian Dempsey (Ind.)910
||
|Stu Briese
|-
| style="background:whitesmoke;"|Arthur-Virden
|
|Lorne Topolniski600
||
|Doyle Piwniuk6,006
|
|
|
|
|
|Frank Godon (Manitoba)846
||
|Doyle Piwniuk
|-
| style="background:whitesmoke;"|Brandon East
|
|Drew Caldwell2,534
||
|Len Isleifson3,669
|
|Vanessa Hamilton830
|
|
|
|
||
|Drew Caldwell
|-
| style="background:whitesmoke;"|Brandon West
|
|Linda Ross1,884
||
|Reg Helwer5,624
|
|William Moore631
|
|
|
|
||
|Reg Helwer
|-
| style="background:whitesmoke;"|Dauphin
|
|Darcy Scheller1,899
||
|Brad Michaleski4,795
|
|Garry Gurke505
|
|Kate Storey595
|
|Darrell Inkster (Manitoba)168
||
|Stan Struthers
|-
| style="background:whitesmoke;"|Riding Mountain
|
|Béla Gyarmati601
||
|Greg Nesbitt5,311
|
|Jordan Fleury1,028
|
|Mark Olenick779
|
|
||
|Leanne Rowat
|-
| style="background:whitesmoke;"|Spruce Woods
|
|Amanda Chmelyk665
||
|Cliff Cullen5,210
|
|Jaron Hart512
|
|
|
|Malcolm McKellar (Manitoba)738
||
|Cliff Cullen
|}

Central Manitoba

|-
| style="background:whitesmoke;"|Emerson
|
|Alanna Jones432
||
|Cliff Graydon4,943
|
|Loren Braul1,423
|
|
|
|
||
|Cliff Graydon
|-
| style="background:whitesmoke;"|Gimli
|
|Armand Bélanger 2,579
||
|Jeff Wharton 5,614
|
|
|
|Dwight Harfield 843
|
|Ed Paquette (Manitoba) 239
||
|vacant
|-
| style="background:whitesmoke;"|Interlake
|
|Tom Nevakshonoff1,428
||
|Derek Johnson3,685
|
|Jamal Abas 2,068
|
|
|
|
||
|Tom Nevakshonoff
|-
| style="background:whitesmoke;"|Lakeside
|
|Matt Austman1,369
||
|Ralph Eichler  6,077
|
|
|
|
|
|
||
|Ralph Eichler
|-
| style="background:whitesmoke;"|Midland
|
|Jacqueline Theroux  714
||
|Blaine Pedersen 6,168
|
|Julia Sisler  523
|
|Stacey O’Neill  797
|
|
||
|Blaine Pedersen
|-
| style="background:whitesmoke;"|Morden-Winkler
|
|Elizabeth Lynch 215
||
|Cameron Friesen 6,598
|
|Benjamin Bawdon279
|
|Mike Urichuk667
|
|
||
|Cameron Friesen
|-
| style="background:whitesmoke;"|Morris
|
|Mohamed Alli840
||
|Shannon Martin6,980
|
|John Falk1,430
|
|
|
|
||
|Shannon Martin
|-
| style="background:whitesmoke;"|Portage la Prairie
|
|Alex MacDonald 697
||
|Ian Wishart4,635
|
|Stephen Prince1,238
|
|
|
|
||
|Ian Wishart
|}

Eastman

|-
| style="background:whitesmoke;"| Dawson Trail
|
|Roxane Dupuis1,678
||
|Bob Lagassé4,430
|
|Terry Hayward1,652
|
|
|
|David Sutherland (Manitoba)516
||
|Ron Lemieux
|-
| style="background:whitesmoke;"|Lac du Bonnet
|
|Wendy Sol1,647
||
|Wayne Ewasko5,666
|
|
|
|
|
|
||
|Wayne Ewasko
|-
| style="background:whitesmoke;"|La Verendrye
|
|Echo Asher705
||
|Dennis Smook5,262
|
|Bill Paulishyn696
|
|Janine Gibson724
|
|
||
|Dennis Smook
|-
| style="background:whitesmoke;"|Steinbach
|
|Kathleen McCallum387
||
|Kelvin Goertzen6,982
|
|Dakota Young-Brown461
|
|
|
|
||
|Kelvin Goertzen
|-
| style="background:whitesmoke;"| St. Paul
|
|Andrew Podolecki1,757
||
|Ron Schuler7,091
|
|Pete Sanderson1,055
|
|
|
|
||
|Ron Schuler
|-
| style="background:whitesmoke;"|Selkirk
|
|Greg Dewar 2,366
||
|Alan Lagimodiere4,686
|
|Stefan Jones 1,390
|
|
|
|
||
|Greg Dewar
|}

Northwest Winnipeg

|-
| style="background:whitesmoke;"|Burrows
|
|Melanie Wight1,775
|
|Rae Wagner1,014
||
|Cindy Lamoureux2,641
|
|Garrett Bodnaryk216
|
|Tony Petrowski (Communist)28
||
|Melanie Wight
|-
| style="background:whitesmoke;"|Kildonan
|
|Dave Chomiak3,065
||
|Nic Curry3,694
|
|Navdeep Khangura974
|
|Steven Stairs456
|
|Gary Marshall (Manitoba)133
||
|Dave Chomiak
|-
| style="background:whitesmoke;"|Point Douglas
||
|Kevin Chief2,839
|
|Marsha Street811
|
|Althea Guiboche956
|
|Alberteen Spence247
|
|Frank Komarniski (Communist)58
||
|Kevin Chief
|-
| style="background:whitesmoke;"|St. Johns
||
|Nahanni Fontaine2,358
|
|Barbara Judt1,869
|
|Noel Bernier1,465
|
|Elizabeth Puchailo671
|
|
||
|Gord Mackintosh
|-
| style="background:whitesmoke;"|The Maples
||
|Mohinder Saran2,832
|
|Kaur Sidhu 2,705
|
|Harbans Singh Brar 1,695
|
|John Redekopp582
|
|
||
|Mohinder Saran
|-
| style="background:whitesmoke;"|Tyndall Park
||
|Ted Marcelino2,139
|
|Naseer Warraich1,306
|
|Aida Champagne1,656
|
|Shane Neustaeter391
|
|
||
|Ted Marcelino
|}

Northeast Winnipeg

|-
| style="background:whitesmoke;"|Concordia
||
|Matt Wiebe 2,761
|
|Andrew Frank 2,483
|
|Donovan Martin 642
|
|
|
|Terry Scott (Manitoba)254
||
|Matt Wiebe
|-
| style="background:whitesmoke;"|Elmwood
||
|Jim Maloway2,993
|
|Sarah Langevin2,886
|
|
|
|
|
|Albert Ratt (Manitoba)579
||
|Jim Maloway
|-
| style="background:whitesmoke;"|Radisson
|
|Preet Singh2,945
||
|James Teitsma4,635
|
|Scott Newman1,593
|
|
|
|
||
|Bidhu Jha
|-
| style="background:whitesmoke;"|River East
|
|Jody Gillis2,435
||
|Cathy Cox6,154
|
|Piero Scaramuzzi776
|
|
|
|
||
|Bonnie Mitchelson
|-
| style="background:whitesmoke;"|Rossmere
|
|Erna Braun3,389
||
|Andrew Micklefield5,303
|
|Malli Aulakh838
|
|
|
|William Sullivan (Manitoba)427
||
|Erna Braun
|-
| style="background:whitesmoke;"|St. Boniface
||
|Greg Selinger3,624
|
|Mamadou Ka2,211
|
|Alain Landry1,663
|
|Signe Knutson1,048
|
|
||
|Greg Selinger
|-
| style="background:whitesmoke;"|Transcona
|
|Barb Burkowski2,281
||
|Blair Yakimoski3,948
|
|Chad Panting1,465
|
|
|
|Darrell Rankin (Communist)68Ajit Kumar (Manitoba)233
||
|Daryl Reid
|}

West Winnipeg

|-
| style="background:whitesmoke;"|Assiniboia
|
|Joseph McKellep2,196
||
|Steven Fletcher3,450
|
|Ian McCausland1,631
|
|Ileana Ohlsson580
|
|
||
|Jim Rondeau
|-
| style="background:whitesmoke;"|Charleswood
|
|Janna Barkman1,168
||
|Myrna Driedger5,298
|
|Paul Brault1,187
|
|Kevin Nichols1,080
|
|
||
|Myrna Driedger
|-
| style="background:whitesmoke;"|Kirkfield Park
|
|Sharon Blady3,075
||
|Scott Fielding5,457
|
|Kelly Nord889
|
|Lisa Omand784
|
|
||
|Sharon Blady
|-
| style="background:whitesmoke;"|St. James
|
|Deanne Crothers2,723
||
|Scott Johnston3,532
|
|Michelle Finley1,150
|
|Jeff Buhse850
|
|Brad Gross (Manitoba)137
||
|Deanne Crothers
|-
| style="background:whitesmoke;"|Tuxedo
|
|Zach Fleisher1,312
||
|Heather Stefanson4,986
|
|Michael Lazar1,251
|
|Bob Krul976
|
|
||
|Heather Stefanson
|}

Central Winnipeg

|-
| style="background:whitesmoke;"|Fort Garry-Riverview
||
|James Allum3,450
|
|Jeannette Montufar3,149
|
|Johanna Wood807
|
|James Beddome1,711
|
|
||
|James Allum
|-
| style="background:whitesmoke;"|Fort Rouge
||
|Wab Kinew3,360
|
|Audrey Gordon2751
|
|Rana Bokhari1,792
|
|Grant Sharp983
|
|Matthew Ostrove (Manitoba)175Paula Ducharme (Communist)47
||
|Jennifer Howard
|-
| style="background:whitesmoke;"|Logan
||
|Flor Marcelino2,020
|
|Allie Szarkiewicz997
|
|Peter Koroma1,457
|
|Jitendradas Loves-Life397
|
|Joe Chan (Manitoba)185Cheryl-Anne Carr (Communist)63
||
|Flor Marcelino
|-
| style="background:whitesmoke;"|Minto
||
|Andrew Swan2,954
|
|Belinda Squance1,016
|
|Demetre Balaktsis723
|
|Martha Jo Willard410
|
|Andrew Taylor (Communist)41Virgil Gil (Manitoba)51Don Woodstock (Ind)589
||
|Andrew Swan
|-
| style="background:whitesmoke;"|River Heights
|
|Shafagh Daneshfar591
|
|Tracey Maconachie3,485
||
|Jon Gerrard5,230
|
|Michael Cardillo771
|
|
||
|Jon Gerrard
|-
| style="background:whitesmoke;"|Wolseley
||
|Rob Altemeyer3,037
|
|Raquel Dancho945
|
|Shandi Strong653
|
|David Nickarz2,645
|
|Wayne Sturby (Manitoba)79
||
|Rob Altemeyer
|}

South Winnipeg

|-
| style="background:whitesmoke;"|Fort Richmond
|
|Kerri Irvin-Ross2,274
||
|Sarah Guillemard2,879
|
|Kyra Wilson814
|
|Cameron Proulx540
|
|
||
|Kerri Irvin-Ross
|-
| style="background:whitesmoke;"|Fort Whyte
|
|George Wong1,718
||
|Brian Pallister6,775
|
|Peter Bastians1,205
|
|Carli Runions731
|
|Daryl Newis (Manitoba)127
||
|Brian Pallister
|-
| style="background:whitesmoke;"|Riel
|
|Christine Melnick3,053
||
|Rochelle Squires5,024
|
|Neil Johnston1,627
|
|
|
|
||
|Christine Melnick
|-
| style="background:whitesmoke;"|Seine River
|
|Lise Pinkos2,343
||
|Janice Morley-Lecomte5,396
|
|Peter Chura2,388
|
|
|
|
||
|Theresa Oswald
|-
| style="background:whitesmoke;"|Southdale
|
|Dashi Zargani2,460
||
|Andrew Smith6,663
|
|Ryan Colyer1,318
|
|
|
|
||
|vacant
|-
| style="background:whitesmoke;"|St. Norbert
|
|Dave Gaudreau3,062
||
|Jon Reyes4,673
|
|James Bloomfield1,251
|
|
|
|Narinder Kaur Johar174
||
|Dave Gaudreau
|-
| style="background:whitesmoke;"|St. Vital
|
|Jamie Moses2,831
||
|Colleen Mayer3,229
|
|Bryan Van Wilgenburg1,296
|
|Kelly Whelan-Enns791
|
|
||
|Nancy Allan

Notes

References

Opinion poll sources

Further reading

External links
 Elections Manitoba

2016 elections in Canada
April 2016 events in Canada
2016